James McHaffie (22 June 1910 — 27 May 1994) was a Scottish-born New Zealand cricketer who played for Otago. He was born in Glasgow and died in Wellington.

McHaffie made a single first-class appearance for the team, during the 1931–32 season, against Auckland. From the tailend, McHaffie scored 6 runs in the first innings in which he batted, and 13 runs in the second.

See also
 List of Otago representative cricketers

External links
James McHaffie at Cricket Archive 

1910 births
1994 deaths
New Zealand cricketers
Otago cricketers
British emigrants to New Zealand